VAST Data is a technology company that focuses on data storage, specifically flash memory. Founded in 2016, VAST has offices in the United States, UK, France, Germany, Australia and Israel. VAST Data was founded with the aim of replacing multiple storage tiers with one solid state platform. 

VAST Data is being used by the National Institutes of Health and Harvard University to combat the COVID-19 pandemic, as well as by Ginkgo Bioworks for genomic studies.

History 
VAST was founded in 2016 by Renen Hallak, a former engineer of R&D at XtremIO, Shachar Fienblit, formerly at Kaminario and Jeff Denworth, formerly at CTERA Networks. Mike Wing of Dell is a part of the leadership team at VAST Data.

VAST Data's launch was supported by Dell and Goldman Sachs. 

As of April 2020, the company had 145 employees, most of which were remote workers.

In April 2021, VAST moved to a software licensing model called Gemini that enables customers to separate the hardware purchasing cycle from the software licensing cost.

Technology 
VAST Data uses Intel's Optane (or  3D Xpoint-based) NVMe SSDs. 3D XPoint non-volatile memory is integrated into VAST Data's architecture, as hardware mechanism to handle computational storage software tasks such as erasure coding, large stripe write shaping, and other software mechanics, so that lower cost, high density  NAND Flash-based SSDs can be effectively used behind the  3D XPoint high performance SSDs.

VAST Data's technology allows for collapsing multiple storage tiers into one that has decoupled compute nodes, which are accessed using NVMe-oF. After data reduction occurs, around 2PB of space is available. The single VAST Data tier uses wide data stripes, with the purpose of global erasure coding. NVMe-linked Databoxes contain flash drives for data and Optane XPoint for metadata. VAST storage enclosures are connected to servers through NVMe-oF, using either 100Gb/s Ethernet or Infiniband.

VAST Data, with regard to universal storage, uses  Flash-QLC and 100 percent persistent global namespace. It supports artificial intelligence applications along with more classical applications such as Web Content or Search.

Its Year 2020 storage architecture release, known as LightSpeed, combines three core elements to deliver parallel and higher scalable performance for AI and HPC. These elements are: 
 RDMA for NFS version 3.
 nconnect to create multiple network paths to a single NFS mount.
  NVidia GPUDirect available for NVIDIA GPU

References

External links 
VAST Data

Technology companies of the United States
Technology companies of Israel
Computer storage companies
Companies based in New York City